Myron Kunin (September 29, 1928 – October 30, 2013) was an American businessman and art collector. He was the founder of the Regis Corporation. His collection of African art was auctioned by Sotheby's in 2014 for over US$40 million. The vast majority of his collection was 20th century American art, much of which is on display at the Minneapolis Institute of Art.

References

1928 births
2013 deaths
People from Minneapolis
University of Minnesota alumni
American company founders
Businesspeople from Minnesota
American art collectors
20th-century American businesspeople